Wolfgang Kummer (born 29 March 1970) is a German ice hockey player. He competed in the men's tournament at the 1994 Winter Olympics.

References

External links
 

1970 births
Living people
Olympic ice hockey players of Germany
Ice hockey players at the 1994 Winter Olympics
People from Rosenheim
Sportspeople from Upper Bavaria